Det største spillet is a 1967 Norwegian war drama directed by Knut Bohwim, starring Gard Øyen, Carl Henrik Størmer and Sverre Anker Ousdal. The film tells the story about Norwegian resistance member Gunvald Tomstad, and his experience as a double agent during World War II.

External links
 
 

1967 films
1967 drama films
Films directed by Knut Bohwim
Norwegian drama films
1960s Norwegian-language films